Lorie Kane,  (born December 19, 1964 in Charlottetown, Prince Edward Island, Canada) is a professional golfer on the LPGA Tour. She began her career on the LPGA Tour in 1996 and has four career victories and 99 top-10 finishes on the tour.  She won the Bobbie Rosenfeld Award in 2000 and became a member of the Order of Canada at a ceremony in December 2006. Kane was the second Canadian to have multiple wins on the LPGA circuit in one season, in 2000, after Sandra Post performed the feat twice, in 1978 and 1979. The next person to do so was Brooke Henderson, in 2016. In 2015, she was inducted into the Canadian Golf Hall of Fame. In May 2020 it was announced that she would be inducted into Canada's Sports Hall of Fame as part of the class of 2020-2021.

Kane is a graduate of Acadia University in Wolfville, Nova Scotia.

Amateur wins
1991 Mexico International Amateur Championship

Professional wins (11)

LPGA Tour wins (4)

LPGA Tour playoff record (2–7)

Other wins (2)
2001 Hyundai Team Matches (with Janice Moodie)
2002 Hyundai Team Matches (with Janice Moodie)

Legends Tour wins (5)

Results in LPGA majors

^ The Women's British Open replaced the du Maurier Classic as an LPGA major in 2001.
^^ The Evian Championship was added as a major in 2013.

CUT = missed the half-way cut
"T" = tied

Summary

Most consecutive cuts made – 9 (2000 U.S. Women's Open – 2002 U.S. Women's Open)
Longest streak of top-10s – 2 (1999 U.S. Women's Open – 1999 du Maurier)

Team appearances
Amateur
Espirito Santo Trophy (representing Canada): 1992

Professional
World Cup (representing Canada): 2005, 2006, 2008
Handa Cup (representing World team): 2010, 2011, 2012 (tie), 2013 (winners), 2015

References

External links
 
 

Canadian female golfers
LPGA Tour golfers
Golfers at the 2015 Pan American Games
Pan American Games competitors for Canada
Members of the Order of Canada
Acadia University alumni
Sportspeople from Charlottetown
1964 births
Living people